Cumminsiella is a genus of fungi belonging to the family Pucciniaceae.

The species of this genus are found in Europe, Northern America and Australia.

Species:

Cumminsiella antarctica 
Cumminsiella mirabilissima 
Cumminsiella santa 
Cumminsiella standleyana 
Cumminsiella stolpiana 
Cumminsiella texana 
Cumminsiella umbrosa 
Cumminsiella wootoniana

References

Pucciniales
Basidiomycota genera